The Central District of Khorrambid County is a district (bakhsh) in Khorrambid County, Fars Province, Iran. At the 2006 census, its population was 26,996, in 6,669 families.  The District has one city: Safashahr. The District has two rural districts (dehestan): Khorrami Rural District and Qeshlaq Rural District.

References 

Khorrambid County
Districts of Fars Province